Otto Schlemmer Building is a historic commercial building located at Crawfordsville, Montgomery County, Indiana. It was originally built in 1854, and renovated to its present form in 1889.  It is a two-story brick building with wood and pressed metal trim.  The front facade features an arcade of six two-story, round-headed brick arches that form a gallery at the second level.   The use of the Roman arch, denticulated frieze, bracketing, and a projecting central pediment are reflective of the Victorian Renaissance style.

It was listed on the National Register of Historic Places in 1985. It is located in the Crawfordsville Commercial Historic District.

Current Use and Ownership

The Otto Schlemmer Building is now owned by Capper Tulley and Reimondo Attorneys at law and has been since 1907. The Building is used as a law office and occupied by highly educated and respected lawyers in Crawfordsville. The current partners of Capper Tulley and Reimondo are John S. Capper and Robert N. Reimondo. The official website is http://capperlaw.info/.

References

Commercial buildings on the National Register of Historic Places in Indiana
Commercial buildings completed in 1854
Renaissance Revival architecture in Indiana
Buildings and structures in Montgomery County, Indiana
National Register of Historic Places in Montgomery County, Indiana
Historic district contributing properties in Indiana
1854 establishments in Indiana
Crawfordsville, Indiana
Law offices
Legal history of Indiana